Senate Bill 17 (SB 17) is a 2017 Kentucky law designed to protect religious freedoms at public schools and post-secondary institutions in the state. The law allows students to express religious views in their assignments, allows teachers to include religious lessons, and permits school clubs and other campus organizations to exclude members on religious grounds. The law has been criticized by LGBT advocates, who contend that this last provision permits student organizations to discriminate on the basis of sexual orientation.

Passage
On February 10, 2017, the Kentucky State Senate voted 31 in favor and 3 against SB 17. On March 6, 2017, the Kentucky House of Representatives voted 81 in favor and 8 against SB 17. On March 16, 2017, Governor Matt Bevin signed SB 17, which goes into effect on June 26, 2017.

See also
 LGBT rights in Kentucky

References

2017 in American law
2017 in LGBT history
Kentucky law
LGBT in Kentucky
Politics of Kentucky